The Splendour of Fear is the second album by English alternative rock band Felt, released in 1984. It is a largely instrumental album based around long guitar passages inspired by classical guitar music, with only tracks 2 and 5 having any lyrics.

The cover art is taken from the poster for the 1966 Andy Warhol/Paul Morrissey film Chelsea Girls, designed by Alan Aldridge. According to Lawrence, he had discovered the image in a library book without knowing who the artist actually was, having assumed it was Warhol himself. Aldridge never approached the band for using it without his permission.

Track listing
All words by Lawrence. All music by Lawrence and Maurice Deebank.

Personnel
Felt
Lawrence – rhythm guitar (tracks 1, 2, 3, and 5), vocals (tracks 2 and 5), lead guitar (track 5)
Maurice Deebank – lead guitar
Mick Lloyd – bass guitar (tracks 1-5)
Gary Ainge – drums (tracks 1-5)

Production
John A. Rivers - production

References 

Felt (band) albums
1984 albums
Cherry Red Records albums
Albums produced by John A. Rivers